Jadcherla Assembly constituency is a constituency of Telangana Legislative Assembly, India. It is one of 14 constituencies in Mahbubnagar district. It is part of Mahbubnagar Lok Sabha constituency.

Dr. C. Laxma Reddy, current Health Minister of Telangana is representing the constituency.

Mandals
The Assembly Constituency presently comprises the following Mandals:

Members of Legislative Assembly

Election results

2018

2014

See also
 List of constituencies of Telangana Legislative Assembly

References

See also
 List of constituencies of Telangana Legislative Assembly

Assembly constituencies of Telangana
Mahbubnagar district